Mekonglema is a genus of Asian long-legged cave spiders first described by H. F. Zhao, S. Q. Li and A. B. Zhang in 2020.

Species
 it contains five species:
M. bailang Zhao & Li, 2020 (type) – China
M. kaorao Zhao & Li, 2020 – Laos
M. walayaku Zhao & Li, 2020 – China
M. xinpingi (Lin & Li, 2008) – China
M. yan Zhao & Li, 2020 – China

See also
 Seychellia
 List of Telemidae species

References

Further reading

Telemidae genera
Spiders of Asia